Carolina Gold Drum and Bugle Corps  is an Open Class competitive junior drum and bugle corps. Formerly based in Rocky Mount and Greensboro in its earlier years, Carolina Gold is now based in Raleigh, NC.

History

Established in the fall of 2000, the primary function of Carolina Gold is to provide a drum and bugle corps for the state of North Carolina. Gold strives to provide its performing members with a stimulating and rewarding instructional, competitive, and social experience. Performance units of this award-winning Corps consists of the horn line, the battery (drum line), front ensemble (pit), and a visual ensemble (color guard).

Carolina Gold members are a diverse group of high school and college musicians, band directors, business people, parents, coming from all walks of life. Members come from North Carolina, South Carolina, and Virginia with ages ranging from 16 to over 50 years of age. Experience levels range from high school through college band as well as drum and bugle corps experience on the DCI World Class level.

Carolina Gold finished in eighth place in Open Class at the 2005 DCA World Championships and in tenth place at the 2006 DCA World Championships in Rochester, NY. In 2009, Gold finished in fourth place in Class A at the 2009 DCA World Championships. In 2010, Gold placed third at the 2010 Championship along with receiving the High Percussion Award. In 2011, Gold once again finished third in Class A at the DCA World Championships and also won first place color guard and again won the Class A high percussion award.
In 2012, Carolina Gold was crowned the DCA Class A World Champion. The Corps once again won first place color guard and first place percussion. For the first time in the Corps history, Carolina Gold won first place in the Brass and Visual captions.

After winning in A Class, Carolina Gold returned to Open Class and was a finalist in 2013 and 2014. In 2015, the corps provided the finals exhibition performance.

In 2018, Carolina Gold returned to the A Class classification, which proved to be a great move for the organization as the Corps placed first at finals and won all the scored caption awards.

In 2020, the corps made the change from an all-age corps to a junior corps and was approved to compete in Drum Corps International under the Open Class division.

Show summary (2001-2022) 
Source:

Winter Guard International
In the past few years, Carolina Gold has started three WGI groups.

Midas Winds
Midas Winds is Carolina Gold's Indoor Winds group. They compete in Independent Open. They are the first WGI winds group to be started by a drum corps They were originally known as The Carolina Gold Winds before they changed to Midas Winds. They have been inactive since the 2018 season due to a lack of membership.

Show Summary 2016–2017

Alchemy Independent
Alchemy Independent is Carolina Gold's Indoor Percussion Group. They were founded in 2016 to provide an Independent Percussion Group to the Triangle Region of North Carolina. They compete in WGI and AIA as a Percussion Independent Open (PIO) group.

Show Summary 2017–Present

Legacy Independent
Legacy independent was Carolina Gold's Indoor Color Guard Program. They Competed In WGI  and AIA as a Color Guard Independent Open (CGIO) Unit. As of 2019, they have combined with First Flight Winterguard From Cary, North Carolina.

References

External links 
 Official website

Drum Corps Associates corps
2000 establishments in North Carolina